Ernest Alexandre Honoré Coquelin (16 May 18488 February 1909) was a French actor. Also called Coquelin Cadet, to distinguish him from his brother, he was born at Boulogne, and entered the Conservatoire in 1864.

He graduated with the first prize in comedy and made his debut in 1867 at the Odéon. The next year he appeared with his brother at the Théâtre Français and became a sociétaire in 1879. He played a great many parts, in both the classic and the modern repertoire, and also had much success in reciting monologues of his own composition. He wrote Le Livre des convalescents (1880), Le Monologue moderne (1881), Fairiboles (1882), Le Rire (1887), Pirouettes (1888).

He died within days of his famous older brother Constant.

References

1848 births
1909 deaths
French male stage actors
People from Boulogne-sur-Mer
Sociétaires of the Comédie-Française